Pycnarmon pseudohesusalis is a moth in the family Crambidae. It was described by Strand in 1920. It is found in the Democratic Republic of Congo (Equateur, East Kasai) and Malawi.

References

Spilomelinae
Moths described in 1920
Moths of Africa